Stelleroidea is a superclass of marine echinoderms including three classes:
 Asteroidea: true sea stars
 Ophiuroidea: brittle stars and basket stars
 Somasteroidea (sometimes also Stomasteroidea): ancestral stelleroids

References

Superclasses (biology)
Echinoderm taxonomy